The Toronto-Buffalo Royals were a charter franchise of World Team Tennis (WTT) founded by John F. Bassett and John C. Eaton, III. The team was sometimes referred to as the Buffalo-Toronto Royals. The Royals played half of their home matches in Toronto, Ontario, Canada and the other half in Buffalo, New York, United States. The Royals played only one season before being sold and moving to Hartford, Connecticut after the 1974 season. The team was contracted by WTT on February 1, 1975. The Royals had 13 wins and 31 losses, and finished in last place in the Central Section missing the playoffs.

Team history
The Royals were founded by Canadian businessman and retired tennis player John F. Bassett and merchant John C. Eaton, III as a charter member of WTT in 1973. Originally, WTT granted the franchise to Toronto. The team began play in WTT's inaugural 1974 season. The Royals played half of their home matches at the CNE Coliseum in Toronto, Ontario, Canada and the other half at the Buffalo Memorial Auditorium in Buffalo, New York, United States. While WTT identified the team as the Toronto-Buffalo Royals in its official standings, the team was sometimes called the Buffalo-Toronto Royals by the Canadian media among others. The team identified itself as the Toronto-Buffalo Royals in its media guide and promotional materials such as team pennants.

The Royals' main attraction was player-coach Tom Okker. However, Okker's contract allowed him to be excused from his commitment to the Royals when he had opportunities to play in ATP or Grand Slam tournaments. So, Okker was effectively a part-time player. The Royals struggled to a record of 13 wins and 31 losses, last place in the Central Section.

On October 16, 1974, team president Bassett announced that the Royals had been sold to Bert Hoffman and Phyllis Morse who said that they would move the team to Hartford, Connecticut.

At the WTT owners meeting on February 1, 1975, each team was required to post a $500,000 letter of credit. Since the Royals failed to do so, the team was contracted by WTT. A dispersal draft was conducted to distribute the players among the remaining teams in the league.

Home courts
The following table shows home courts used by the Toronto-Buffalo Royals in 1974, the only season in which they competed in WTT.

1974 roster
The Toronto-Buffalo Royals roster for the 1974 season was
 Tom Okker, Player-Coach
 Mike Estep
 Jan O'Neill
 Wendy Overton
 Laura Rossouw

See also

 World TeamTennis
 1974 World Team Tennis season

References

External links
 Official World TeamTennis Website

Defunct World TeamTennis teams
1973 establishments in Ontario
1973 establishments in New York (state)
Tennis in Canada
Tennis in Connecticut
Tennis in New York (state)
Sports teams in Toronto
Sports teams in New York (state)
Sports in Buffalo, New York
Sports clubs established in 1973
Defunct sports teams in New York (state)
Sports clubs disestablished in 1975
1974 disestablishments in Ontario
1974 disestablishments in New York (state)
1974 establishments in Connecticut
1975 disestablishments in Connecticut
Tennis in Ontario